Martin Randall Travel is a cultural tour operator in Britain. It specialises in small group tours and classical music festivals.

History 
Martin Randall Travel was founded by a former art history student in 1988. Its primary focus is the organisation of small group tours, led by a lecturer who is an expert in their field. In 1994, the company expanded into producing music festivals to complement their small group tours. The company pioneered this concept , and has four festivals confirmed for 2022 including Polyphony in Portugal, The Suffolk Festival, Music Along the Danube, and Venice: Pageantry & Piety. As of 2018, their programme contains over two hundred tours and events in more than fifty different countries.

Critical acclaim 
Martin Randall Travel focuses on a small clientele and has received favourable reviews.  Ian Irvine in The Independent said, "All three... highlights from my life as a cultural tourist were part of the remarkable series of music festivals run by Martin Randall." Christine Headley praised Martin Randall Travel's handling of money - covering most costs and distributing local currency - on the festival she attended. Kenneth Asch wrote in the Travellers' Handbook, "Of all the travel services I have researched, Martin Randall Travel is perhaps the most comprehensive, culturally speaking."

Martin Randall Travel won the British Travel Awards: Best Special Interest Holiday Company (Small) award in 2015, 2016, 2017, 2018 & 2019.

Directors
 Martin Randall, founder
 Vernon Ellis
 Neil Taylor
 Fiona Charrington

References

External links 
 

Travel and holiday companies of the United Kingdom